The 2011 Bank of America 500 was a NASCAR Sprint Cup Series stock car race held on October 15, 2011, at Charlotte Motor Speedway in Concord, North Carolina. Contested over 334 laps on the 1.5-mile (2.4 km) asphalt quad-oval, it was the 31st race of the 2011 Sprint Cup Series season, as well as the fifth race in the ten-race Chase for the Sprint Cup, which ends the season. The race was won by Matt Kenseth for the Roush Fenway Racing team. Kyle Busch finished second, and Carl Edwards clinched third.

Report

Background

Charlotte Motor Speedway is one of ten intermediate to hold NASCAR races; the others are Atlanta Motor Speedway, Kansas Speedway, Chicagoland Speedway, Darlington Raceway, Homestead Miami Speedway, New Hampshire Motor Speedway, Kentucky Speedway, Las Vegas Motor Speedway, and Texas Motor Speedway. The track's turns are banked at twenty-four degrees, while the front stretch, the location of the finish line, is five degrees. The back stretch, opposite of the front, also had a five degree banking. The racetrack has seats for 140,000 spectators.

Heading into the fifth race of the Chase for the Sprint Cup, Ford driver Carl Edwards was leading the Drivers' Championship with 2,161 points; Chevrolet driver Kevin Harvick was second with 2,160 points, one point behind Edwards. Behind Edwards and Harvick in the Drivers' Championship, Jimmie Johnson was third with 2,157 points in a Chevrolet, and Brad Keselowski was fourth with 2,150 points. Matt Kenseth was fifth with 2,149, four points ahead of Kurt Busch. Tony Stewart, Kyle Busch, Dale Earnhardt Jr., and Jeff Gordon rounded out the first ten positions in the Drivers' Championship. Chevrolet had already secured the Manufacturer's Championship one week earlier after the Hollywood Casino 400, and entered the race on 204 points, 43 points ahead of Ford on 161 points and 50 points ahead of Toyota. Jamie McMurray was the race's defending winner.

Practice and qualifying

Three practice sessions were held before the race; the first on Thursday, which lasted 90 minutes. The second and third were both on Friday afternoon. The first Saturday practice lasted 45 minutes, while the second lasted 60. Kasey Kahne was quickest with a time of 28.205 seconds in the first session, 0.018 seconds faster than Paul Menard. Greg Biffle was just off Busch's pace, followed by Mark Martin, Regan Smith, and Marcos Ambrose. Denny Hamlin was seventh, still within two-tenths of a second of Edwards's time.

Forty-six cars were entered for qualifying, but only forty-three could qualify for the race because of NASCAR's qualifying procedure. Stewart clinched the 13th pole position of his career, with a time of 28.131 seconds. He was joined on the front row of the grid by Kenseth. Edwards qualified third, A. J. Allmendinger took fourth, and Biffle started fifth. Ryan Newman, Menard, Kahne, Johnson and Trevor Bayne rounded out the first ten positions. The three drivers that failed to qualify for the race were Geoffrey Bodine, Scott Speed, and Josh Wise.

Once the qualifying session completed, Stewart commented, "I was watching guys' lap times, and looking at the sheet to seeing what they practiced, and it wasn't as much [of an increase] as what we've seen. I think, obviously, we've had a lot of cloud cover today and cool temperatures here the last couple of days, so I don't think the track changed as much and got as hot during the day as what we typically see here. I think that's the reason that we didn't have the big pick-ups. But you still anticipate that, at night, the guys are going to pick up speed. It just seems like the air's a little muggier right now. I don't know whether that hurt horsepower or even created more drag and kind of evened everything out."

In the second practice session, Keselowski was fastest with a time of 28.810 seconds, less than a tenth of a second quicker than second-placed Kahne. Newman took third place, ahead of Kurt Busch, Stewart and Kyle Busch. Johnson was only quick enough for the 10th position. In the third and final practice, Kahne remained quickest with a time of 28.700 seconds. Menard followed in second, ahead of Biffle and Johnson. Jeff Burton was fifth quickest, with a time of 28.855 seconds. Newman, Ambrose, Gordon, Allmendinger, and Kurt Busch rounded out the first ten positions.

Race

Results

Qualifying

Race results

Standings after the race

Drivers' Championship standings

Manufacturers' Championship standings

Note: Only the first twelve positions are included for the driver standings.

References

Bank of America 500
Bank of America 500
NASCAR races at Charlotte Motor Speedway
October 2011 sports events in the United States